Josep Antoni Noya Bou (23 August 1939 – 10 January 2021) was a Spanish professional footballer who played as a forward.

Career
Born in Sant Pau d'Ordal, Noya played for Terrassa Sabadell, Atlético Madrid, Calvo Sotelo and Granada.

References

1939 births
2021 deaths
Spanish footballers
Terrassa FC footballers
Real Zaragoza players
CE Sabadell FC footballers
Atlético Madrid footballers
CD Puertollano footballers
Granada CF footballers
Segunda División players
La Liga players
Association football forwards